Mudramothiram is a 1978 Indian Malayalam film, directed by J. Sasikumar and produced by E. K. Thyagarajan. The film stars Prem Nazir, Jayabharathi, Jagathy Sreekumar and Sankaradi in the lead roles. The film has musical score by G. Devarajan.

Cast
Prem Nazir as Sudhakaran
Jayabharathi as Usha
Jagathy Sreekumar 
Sankaradi as Swami
 Manavalan Joseph as Mathai
 Kunchan as Baiju
Maniyanpilla Raju as Kuttappan
Baby Sumathi as Amina
Bahadoor as Doctor
 Nellikode Bhaskaran as Beeran
 Sreelatha Namboothiri as Kamalamma
Meena as Sudhakaran's Mother
Stanley
Seema as Rani

Soundtrack
The music was composed by G. Devarajan and the lyrics were written by Sreekumaran Thampi.

References

External links
 

1978 films
1970s Malayalam-language films
Films directed by J. Sasikumar